Thyrea may refer to:

 Thyrea (lichen), a genus of lichens in the family Lichinaceae
 Thyrea (Greece), a city of ancient Greece